Historic Forks of the Wabash is a historic museum park near Huntington, Indiana, that features site several historic buildings, trails and remnants of the Wabash and Erie Canal. The location was the signing location of the historic Treaty at the Forks of the Wabash in 1838. The park is located along the Wabash River.  It was listed on the National Register of Historic Places in 1985 as the Chief Richardville House and Miami Treaty Grounds.

Historic structures include:
 Chief's House - Council house believed to have been used by Miami tribe Chief Jean Baptiste de Richardville during treaty negotiations and Miami Council meetings. Other sources indicate that his son-in-law, Francis La Fontaine, actually built the house in the early 1840s for use as his main residence.  The house has been restored to appear as in 1846.
 Nuck Log House - 1841 pioneer log house
 School House - Pioneer-era log schoolhouse furnished for the 1880s

Ball State University conducted an archaeological dig at the Chief's House in 1989 which uncovered artifacts including nails, brick, glass, toys, housewares, and personal items. An additional excavation occurred in 1999.

The park offers programs for groups of all ages. Topics include archaeology, canals and transportation, pioneer life, Woodland Indian history, and art.

References

External links
 Historic Forks of the Wabash

Open-air museums in Indiana
Historic American Buildings Survey in Indiana
Historic districts on the National Register of Historic Places in Indiana
Museums in Huntington County, Indiana
Historic districts in Huntington County, Indiana
National Register of Historic Places in Huntington County, Indiana